Roy Taylor (6 August 1891 – 17 March 1969) was an Australian rules footballer who played with Richmond in the Victorian Football League (VFL).

Family
The son of William Taylor (1862-), and Frances Louisa Anscombe (1862-1952), Roy Taylor was born at Carlton, Victoria on 6 August 1891.

He married Ada Elizabeth Cowling (1893-1919) at Brunswick, Victoria on 7 February 1920.

Football

Richmond (VFL)
Recruited from Beverley Juniors, he made his debut for Richmond, against Collingwood, at Punt Road, on 6 May 1916, and went on tp play in all of the season's 12 home-and-away matches, as well as in Richmond's Semi-Final loss to Carlton, 9.11 (65) to 12.10 (82).

Although he did not play in the 1917 season's first game, against Collingwood, at Victoria Park, on 12 May 1917, he played in each of remaining 14 home-and-away games.

He played in seven of Richmond's fourteen home-and-away matches in 1918.

Brunswick (VFA)
He was cleared from Richmond to Brunswick in 1919.

Notes

References
 Hogan P: The Tigers of Old: A complete History of Every Player to Represent the Richmond Football Club between 1908 and 1996, Richmond FC, (Melbourne), 1996.

External links 

 Roy Taylor, at The VFA Project.

1891 births
1969 deaths
Australian rules footballers from Melbourne
Richmond Football Club players
Brunswick Football Club players
People from Carlton, Victoria